Lake Albert is a lake in South Dakota, in the United States. It is on the border of Kingsbury County and Hamlin County.

Lake Albert was named after John James Abert, a cartographer of the American West. According to a Federal Writers’ Project volume on South Dakota place names, “The present name is a corruption of ‘Abert.’”

See also
List of lakes in South Dakota

References

Lakes of South Dakota
Lakes of Hamlin County, South Dakota
Lakes of Kingsbury County, South Dakota